Astanlı is a village in the municipality of Aşağı Astanlı in the Yardymli Rayon of Azerbaijan.

References

Populated places in Yardimli District